John Rowland is a fictional character portrayed by actor Jesse Metcalfe and created by television producer and screenwriter Marc Cherry for the ABC television series Desperate Housewives. The character is introduced as the teenage gardener of one of the titular housewives, Gabrielle Solis (Eva Longoria), with whom she cheats on her husband, Carlos Solis (Ricardo Antonio Chavira).

Development and casting
Before Jesse Metcalfe was cast as John Rowland, actor Kyle Searles originated the role in the unaired pilot of the show. In June 2004, ABC called for three starring cast members to be recast. Metcalfe replaced Searles as John Rowland, as producers wanted to add more sexual appeal to the role "to justify why (Gabrielle) was having an affair." Metcalfe had previously read for the role during the initial casting process.

Metcalfe was a regular cast member during the first season. However, after the affair is revealed to Carlos in the first season finale by John himself, Metcalfe left the regular cast. Since his departure, he has made several guest appearances in subsequent seasons.

Storylines

Season 1
John Rowland is employed by Gabrielle and Carlos Solis as a gardener. Gabrielle, having become bored with her husband never having time for her, decides to seduce her teenage gardener. The pair embark on an illicit affair, which encounter several difficulties. The most prolific  comes when Gabrielle's mother in law, Mama Solis, arrives at Wisteria Lane, called there by her son to discover if Gabrielle is cheating. Juanita digs to learn the truth. However, she is hit by a car driven by Andrew Van de Kamp after she discovers the affair and ends up in a coma. John becomes overwhelmed with guilt, confessing the affair to Father Crowley.

John's mother, Helen Rowland, overhears a conversation between her son and his friend Justin, in which they allude to the fact the John was sleeping with a housewife. Helen suspected Susan Mayer, but then Gabrielle confesses, promising Helen that it is over. Helen tells her that, "It's not even close to being over". Afterward, when the police arrive at the Solis house to arrest Carlos, Gabrielle thinks they have come for her, sent by Helen. Weeks later, in the episode "Your Fault," the Rowlands meet with Gabrielle to tell her John has moved out and that they expect her to help them move back into their house. Gabrielle then meets with John; he proposes to her. Gabrielle is forced to reject him. It is later revealed that Danielle Van de Kamp has a crush on John and wants to give him her virginity, but her mother Bree stops that from happening. John becomes re-entranced by Gabrielle; he may have conceived her unborn child. He demands to see Carlos but Gabrielle refuses, explaining to him that Carlos is the father of the child, no matter what, because Carlos can provide for it.

Instead of backing up, John arrives at Carlos's gay hate trial in the season finale and tells him "he got the wrong guy". "Didn't you think it was strange that you had the only lawn on Wisteria Lane that needed to be mowed three times a week?", he said. Carlos goes mad and attempts to attack John, but it looks like he was attacking Justin – the gay person he beat up previously. Carlos is arrested. While discussing the courtroom scene in which Carlos attacks John, Ricardo Antonio Chavira commented: "People can see the full rage that is in my character. I'm yelling at him, 'I'm gonna kill you' ... Then I broke into Spanish: "Te voy a matar!" ... I just went for it ... Then I looked, and Jesse [Metcalfe] had the most honest look of sheer terror. I think I scared the living shit out of him." Another scene between Gabrielle and John was also cut for time.

Season 2
After what happened at the court in the previous season, Gabrielle breaks up with John. John looks for new housewives to be with intimately and starts having an affair with 41-year-old Joan. Upon finding this out, Gabrielle destroys Joan's garden and shuts John out of her life.

The beginning of Gabrielle's affair with John is first seen in the second season finale in flashbacks. After their first sexual encounter, Gabrielle tells John that this was the only time it would ever happen.

Season 3
John is not seen again until early in the third season. According to his dialogue in episode 3.03 (A Weekend in the Country) he is doing well, and is very rich and successful with his gardening company. He is engaged to the daughter of the Sinclair Hotel owner, Tammy Sinclair. John and Gabrielle hook up in this episode, but John explains to her after that he is not planning to risk his marriage by continuing to have an affair with her. About six months later, in episode 3.17 (Dress Big) Gabrielle tells Edie Britt that John is now married.

Season 4
In the fourth season, John meets Gabrielle at a hotel owned by his father-in-law and realizes that he still loves her. He constantly fights with his wife over the fact that she wants to lead his life. He tries to get back with Gabrielle, but she refuses because his wife is pregnant and she (Gabrielle) is married to Victor Lang, but is having an affair with Carlos. Carlos, who eavesdrops, realizes that he is just like how John used to be; he finally forgives him. The two talk. John asks him if he thinks Gabrielle is happy. Carlos replies "I think she is".

Season 6
John reappears in the sixth season, set six years after the events of the fourth season. He is divorced from Tammy, but managed to get a huge amount of money from the divorce, so he now owns a restaurant. John sees Gabrielle in the restaurant, along with Carlos, their daughters and their niece, Ana Solis. While Gabrielle looks like a mess, John notices how beautiful Ana is and is surprised that she is from Carlos's side of the family. When Gabrielle fixes herself up, Carlos suspects that she still has feeling for John. John offers to hire Ana as a waitress. Gabrielle declines, Carlos saying that this is because she is jealous. After consulting Carlos, John hires Ana.

When Gabrielle sees John dropping her off after work, she is furious with John for flirting with Ana and decides that she will now be picking Ana up from work. Gabrielle then finds out that Ana bought condoms, as she is in love with John, and she goes to the restaurant to tell him to leave Ana alone. John believes that Gabrielle still has feelings for him and kisses her after expressing that he can provide for her now; Gabrielle declines him yet again. Ana sees them kissing. Gabrielle tells her of the affair that happened many years before.

Reception
John Rowland was viewed as a sex symbol for the show during its first season. John, who USA Today described as "buff 'n' sweaty", became popular with mothers who watched the show and helped Metcalfe become established as "the [show's] hottest sex symbol". Longoria attributed John's appeal to the fact that he was seen shirtless in every episode, also describing him as "a really innocent young kid who hasn't been tainted by the world. And I think that's very endearing to people who watch." While reviewing the first season finale, Ann Hodgman of Entertainment Weekly stated that her interest in the Gabrielle and Carlos storyline was ruined by John telling Carlos about the affair rather than Carlos discovering it himself.

References 

Desperate Housewives characters
Fictional businesspeople
Television characters introduced in 2004
Fictional horticulturists and gardeners
Teenage characters in television

pl:Znajomi Gabrielle Solis#John Rowland